PRPA may refer to:

 Branka Prpa (born 1953), Serbian historian
 Luka Prpa (born 1998), American soccer player
 Philadelphia Regional Port Authority
 Prince Rupert Port Authority
 Puerto Rico Ports Authority
 Platte River Power Authority, see Bison Solar Plant